Isabelle Chartrand (born April 20, 1978) is a Canadian retired ice hockey defenceman. As a member of the Canadian national ice hockey team, she won Olympic gold at the 2002 Winter Olympics and a gold medal at the 2001 IIHF Women's World Championship.

Playing career
Chartrand began playing ringette as a child but would eventually shift to ice hockey. By the age of 16, she was a member of Team Quebec. At the 1995 Canada Winter Games, she would claim a bronze medal in ice hockey. Four years later, she took gold with Team Quebec at the Esso women's hockey nationals.

She played two seasons, 1998–99 and 1999–2000, with Laval Le Mistral of the National Women's Hockey League.

NCAA
Prior to the 2002 Olympics, Chartrand attended St. Lawrence University in Canton, New York. As a member of the St. Lawrence Saints women's ice hockey program in the ECAC Hockey conference, Chartrand was named Rookie of the Week on January 15, 2001. 

She is one of only three athletes from St. Lawrence University to have an Olympic Gold Medal – the others are Ed Rimkus and Gina Kingsbury.

International play 
Chartrand competed at the 2002 Winter Olympics in Salt Lake City before her 24th birthday. Chartrand was one of the youngest members of the team. Chartrand had two goals and an assist for Team Canada’s gold medal winning team at the 2002 Winter Olympics. 

Her previous experience with Team Canada was a Gold Medal at the 2001 IIHF Women’s World Championship. Also a member of the Canada women's national inline hockey team, Chartrand won a gold medal at the 2002 FIRS Inline Hockey World Championships.

References

External links
 
 
 

1978 births
Living people
Canadian women's ice hockey defencemen
Canadian expatriate ice hockey players in Austria
Canadian expatriate ice hockey players in Russia
Canadian expatriate ice hockey players in the United States
Canadian women's national inline hockey team players
Ice hockey people from Montreal
Ice hockey players at the 2002 Winter Olympics
Medalists at the 2002 Winter Olympics
Olympic gold medalists for Canada
Olympic ice hockey players of Canada
Olympic medalists in ice hockey
People from Anjou, Quebec
St. Lawrence Saints women's ice hockey players